Israel women's national under-17 football team is the football team representing Israel in competitions for under-17 year old players and is controlled by the Israel Football Association. The team is yet to appear in the UEFA Women's Under-17 Championship.

The team participated in the 2013 Maccabiah Games, in the junior girls tournament, winning the silver medals, after winning matches against Canada, Brazil, Sweden, South Africa and Australia and losing their final match against the U.S.A.

Competitive record

UEFA Women's Under-17 Championship

References

External links
Women's U-17 @ Israeli Football Association
Israel Women's Under-17 @ uefa.com

F
Youth football in Israel
Women's national under-17 association football teams